</noinclude>

Vladimir Alexandrovich Antonov-Ovseenko (9 March 1883 – 10 February 1938), real surname Ovseenko, party aliases 'Bayonet' (Штык) and 'Nikita' (Ники́та), literary pseudonym A. Gal (А. Га́льский), was a prominent Bolshevik leader, Soviet statesman, military commander, and diplomat.

Early career
He was born in Chernihiv, the son of an infantry officer and nobleman. He was of Ukrainian ethnicity.

He studied at the secondary military school of Voronezh, but left the army in 1901 and joined a student Marxist circle in Warsaw. He graduated from military college in Saint Petersburg in 1904. 

In 1902 he secretly joined the Russian Social Democratic Labour Party (RSDLP) and set about organising a military section of the party among graduate officers in five cities. Early in the Russian Revolution of 1905 he led an uprising in Novo-Alexandria in Poland and was arrested for the first time, but escaped to Vienna in spring 1905. There he joined the Menshevik faction of the RSDLP. He returned to Saint Petersburg in May, and was made chairman of the military organisation of the RSDLP Saint Petersburg committee. 

Rearrested in April 1906, he broke out of jail five days later, and moved to Sevastopol, on Crimea, where he organised a military revolt. Arrested and sentenced to death, his sentence was later commuted to 20 years hard labour in Siberia. 

He escaped in June 1907, and hid out in Moscow, in the home of a sympathetic lawyer, Pavel Malyantovich. For three years, he worked among co-operatives and with the printers' union in Moscow, until his next arrest, after which he emigrated to Prussia, in July 1910, but was deported, and settled in Paris, where he acted as secretary of the Menshevik bureau.

Soon after the outbreak of World War I, Antonov-Ovseenko broke with the Mensheviks, and founded the anti-war paper Golos (Голос - 'Voice'), later renamed Nashe Slovo (Наше слово - Our Word), which he co-edited with Leon Trotsky and Julius Martov. He returned to Russia in June 1917, joined the Bolsheviks and was briefly head of the party organisation in Helsingfors and Chairman of the Northern Congress of Soviets. He was arrested after the pro-Bolshevik riots in July, and detained, with Trotsky, in Krestny prison. He was freed on the day that the right wing military revolt led by General Kornilov collapsed, and returned to Helsingfors.

Storming of Winter Palace 
Antonov-Ovseenko returned to Petrograd in October 1917 and was appointed secretary of the Military Revolutionary Committee of the Petrograd Soviet. That meant that he played a pivotal role in military preparations for the October Revolution. Trotsky, who witnessed him in action, described him as "politically shaky, but personally courageous - impulsive and disorderly, but capable of initiative..." 

He personally led the famous storming of the Winter Palace on 7 November (25 October according to the Julian Calendar still used in Russia at the time), when Red Guards broke into the building where ministers of the Russian Provisional Government (excluding Prime Minister Alexander Kerensky), had taken refuge, and arrested them. They included Kerensky's Minister for Justice, Pavel Malyantovich, who had given Antonov-Ovseenko sanctuary ten years earlier. There were no lives lost in the incident, which took on something like mythical status in Soviet history. It formed the climax of the classic 1928 silent movie October, directed by Sergei Eisenstein, in which Antonov-Ovseenko took a starring role, playing himself.

Political career 

In the initial government formed by Vladimir Lenin after the Bolsheviks had seized power, Antonov-Ovseenko was appointed to the Military Committee of Sovnarkom. He was sent to lead the Bolshevik side in the first, relatively bloodless engagement of the civil war at Gatchina, against Kerensky and a detachment of Cossacks, but had to be replaced after he virtually collapsed from nervous exhaustion. 

On 21 December 1917, Antonov-Ovseenko was put in charge of the Revolutionary forces in Ukraine and southern Russia. The army subsequently captured Kharkiv, where Soviet power in Ukraine was proclaimed. He opposed Lenin's decision to end the war with Germany under the Treaty of Brest-Litovsk and was dismissed from the Red Army in May 1918 for fomenting guerrilla warfare against the advancing German army. 

He was reinstated as People's Commissar for War in Ukraine in September 1918 and oversaw the defeat of Ukrainian People's Republic and White Army forces in Ukraine, ensuring the creation of the Ukrainian SSR. During that campaign, Antonov-Ovseenko ordered the execution of the tsarist general Paul von Rennenkampf, after he refused an offer by the Bolsheviks to command a unit in the Red Army, with refusal implying death. 

By the end of the Russian Civil War, Antonov-Ovseenko was in charge of the Tambov Governorate, brutally suppressing the 1920–21 Tambov Rebellion, alongside Mikhail Tukhachevsky, with the use of chemical weapons. In 1921, he was in charge of famine relief in the Samara region.

In 1922, Antonov-Ovseenko was given the highly sensitive post of head of the Political Directorate of the Red Army, despite his public opposition to Lenin's New Economic Policy, which he denounced in a speech to the April 1922 Congress of the Russian Communist Party (Bolsheviks) (CPSU) as a sell-out to the peasants. During Lenin's terminal illness he backed Trotsky in the struggle for succession. He was a signatory of The Declaration of 46 in October 1923, which called for greater party democracy. 

In December, after one of his subordinates had been sacked for criticising the leadership, he wrote an angry letter to the Central Committee exclaiming that "we are not courtiers to the throne of party hierarchs!" In January 1924, he was summoned before the Orgburo, which was controlled by Joseph Stalin, and sacked.

Later in 1923, Antonov-Ovseenko was sent on a mission to China - the start of an 11-year career as a diplomat. In 1925, he was recalled and appointed Soviet representative in Czechoslovakia. He was one of a large group of Trotsky's supporters expelled from the CPSU in December 1927, but was one of the first to recant and seek readmission to the party during 1928. 

Later he was envoy in Poland, but in May 1934 was recalled to Moscow to serve as a Public Prosecutor. In this capacity, he observed the first of the great Moscow show trials, in which Grigory Zinoviev and Lev Kamenev were the main defendants, and signed an article in Izvestia calling for them to be shot. He was then posted to Barcelona, as Soviet Consul General, during the Spanish Civil War, where he directed the supply of Soviet aid to the Second Spanish Republic and where he organized the repression against the POUM party. He was recalled to Moscow in August 1937, where he talked with Joseph Stalin about the events in Spain. After a month without a job he was appointed People's Commissar for Justice of the Russian SFSR in September 1937, but, after just one month in that post, he was arrested during the night of 11–12 October 1937 and interrogated. He was shot dead on 10 February 1938.

Antonov-Ovseenko was the first former Trotskyist to be posthumously rehabilitated, and in 1956 was named in a speech by Anastas Mikoyan to the 20th party congress of the CPSU. Later, his son Anton, a historian, feared that his father was to be 'un-rehabilitated', and fought a long rearguard battle to protect his father's reputation.

See also
Albert Rhys Williams, American journalist who wrote a number of books about the revolutionary activities in Petrograd of 1917–18, of which he was eyewitness. He mentioned Ovseenko as the military leader of the October Revolution. He visited the Soviet Union again on several occasions before World War II.
Anton Antonov-Ovseenko (1920–2013), historian and writer, his son

References

External links

Historical biography dictionary at hrono.ru 
Antonov-Ovseenko at the protivpytok.org

1883 births
1938 deaths
Ambassadors of the Soviet Union to Czechoslovakia
Ambassadors of the Soviet Union to Poland
Great Purge victims from Ukraine
Justice ministers of Russia
Left Opposition
Mensheviks
Mezhraiontsy
Old Bolsheviks
People from Chernihiv
People from Chernigovsky Uyezd
People of the Hungarian–Romanian War
People of the Russian Revolution
Recipients of the Order of the Red Banner
Russian Constituent Assembly members
Russian revolutionaries
Russian Social Democratic Labour Party members
Russian Trotskyists
Soviet defence ministers of Ukraine
Soviet diplomats
Soviet military personnel of the Russian Civil War
Soviet Ministers of Defence
Soviet people of the Spanish Civil War
Soviet people of the Ukrainian–Soviet War
Soviet rehabilitations
Ukrainian revolutionaries